Muhammad Pehimi bin Yusof is a Malaysian politician and served as Terengganu State Executive Councillor.

Election Results

References

Living people
People from Terengganu
Malaysian people of Malay descent
Malaysian Muslims
United Malays National Organisation politicians
Members of the Terengganu State Legislative Assembly
Terengganu state executive councillors
21st-century Malaysian politicians
Year of birth missing (living people)